Pig Island may refer to:

 Pig Island (Exuma), the Bahamas
 Pig Island (Newfoundland and Labrador), Canada
 Pig Island, New Zealand, in Lake Wakatipu
 Pig Island, County Down, a townland in County Down, Northern Ireland
 Pig Island (Queensland), Australia
 Pig Island (novel), a British thriller novel
 "Pig Island" (song), a song by Sandra Boynton and Michael Ford
 Pig Island, a fictional island in the Angry Birds films

See also
 Île aux Cochons, Crozet Archipelago, South Indian Ocean